The 1930 Washington & Jefferson Presidents football team was an American football team that represented Washington & Jefferson College as an independent during the 1930 college football season. The team compiled a 6–2–1 record and outscored opponents by a total of 164 to 65. Bill Amos was the head coach.

Schedule

References

Washington and Jefferson
Washington & Jefferson Presidents football seasons
Washington and Jefferson Presidents football